Lari is a given name which may refer to:

 Lari Ketner (1977–2014), American basketball player
 Lari Lehtonen (born 1987), Finnish cross-country skier
 Lari Pittman (born 1952), Colombian-American artist and professor
 Lari White (1965–2018), American country music singer

See also
 Larry, another given name